Congolese music is one of the most influential music forms of the African continent. Since the 1930s, Congolese musicians have had a huge impact on the African musical scene and elsewhere. Many contemporary genres of music, such as Kenyan Benga and Colombian Champeta, have been heavily influenced by Congolese music. In 2021, Congolese rumba joined other living traditions such as Jamaican reggae music and Cuban rumba on UNESCO's "intangible cultural heritage of humanity" list.

Music of the Democratic Republic of the Congo varies in its different forms. Outside Africa, most music from the Democratic Republic of Congo is called Soukous, which most accurately refers instead to a dance popular in the late 1960s.  The term rumba or rock-rumba is also used generically to refer to Congolese music, though neither is precise nor accurately descriptive.

People from the Congo have no single term for their own music per se, although muziki na biso ("our music") was used until the late 1970s, and now the most common name is ndule, which simply means music in the Lingala language; most songs from the Democratic Republic of the Congo are sung in Lingala.

History

Colonial times (pre-1960)
Since the colonial era, Kinshasa, Congo's capital, has been one of the great centers of musical innovation.  The country, however, was carved out from territories controlled by many different ethnic groups, many of which had little in common with each other. Each maintained (and continue to do so) their own folk music traditions, and there was little in the way of a pan-Congolese musical identity until the 1940s.

Like much of Africa, Congo was dominated during the World War II-era by rumba. Congolese musicians appropriated rumba and adapted its characteristics for their  instruments and tastes. In the 1950s, record labels began appearing, including CEFA, Ngoma, Loningisa and Opika, each issuing many 78 rpm records; Radio Congo Belge also began broadcasting during this period. Bill Alexandre, a Belgian working for CEFA, brought electric guitars to the Congo.

Popular early musicians include Camille Feruzi, who is said to have popularized rumba during the 1930s and guitarists like Zachery Elenga, Antoine Wendo Kolosoy and, most influentially, Jean Bosco Mwenda.  Alongside rumba, other imported genres like American swing, French cabaret and Ghanaian highlife were also popular.

In 1953, the Congolese music scene began to differentiate itself with the formation of African Jazz (led by Joseph "Le Grand Kallé" Kabasele), the first full-time orchestra to record and perform, and the debut of fifteen-year-old guitarist François Luambo Makiadi (aka Franco). Both would go on to be some of the earliest Congolese music stars.  African Jazz, which included Kabasele, sometimes called the father of modern Congolese music, as well as legendary Cameroonian saxophonist and keyboardist Manu Dibango, has become one of the most well-known groups in Africa, largely due to 1960's "Indépendance Cha Cha", which celebrated Congo's independence and became an anthem for similar movements across the continent.

Big bands (c. 1950–70)
Into the 1950s, Kinshasa and Brazzaville became culturally linked, and many musicians moved back and forth between them, most importantly Nino Malapet and one of the founders of OK Jazz, Jean Serge Essous.  Recording technology had evolved to allow for longer playing times, and the musicians focused on the seben, an instrumental percussion break with a swift tempo that was common in rumba.  Both OK Jazz and African Jazz continued performing throughout the decade until African Jazz broke up in the mid-1960s, TPOK Jazz with Franco Luambo Makiadi at the helm dominated soukous music for the next 20 years.

Tabu Ley Rochereau and Dr. Nico then formed African Fiesta, which incorporated new innovations from throughout Africa as well as American and British soul, rock and country.  African Fiesta, however, lasted only two years before disintegrating, and Tabu Ley formed Orchestre Afrisa International instead, but this new group was not able to rival OK Jazz in influence for very long.

Many of the most influential musicians of Congo's history emerged from one or more of these big bands, including the colossus Franco Luambo Makiadi usually referred to simply as "Franco", Sam Mangwana, Ndombe Opetum, Vicky Longomba, Dizzy Madjeku and Verckys Kiamuangana Mateta.  Mangwana was the most popular of these solo performers, keeping a loyal fanbase even while switching from Vox Africa and Festival des Marquisards to Afrisa, followed by OK Jazz and a return to Africa before setting up a West African group called the African All Stars.  Mose Fan Fan of OK Jazz also proved influential, bringing Congolese rumba to East Africa, especially Kenya, after moving there in 1974 with Somo Somo.  Rumba also spread through the rest of Africa, with Brazzaville's Pamelo Mounk'a and Tchico Thicaya moving to Abidjan and Ryco Jazz taking the Congolese sound to the French Antilles.

In Congo, students at Gombe High School became entranced with American rock and funk, especially after James Brown visited Zambia in 1970 and Kinshasa in 1974. Los Nickelos and Thu Zahina emerged from Gombe High, with the former moving to Brussels  and the latter, though existing only briefly, becoming legendary for their energetic stage shows that included frenetic, funky drums during the seben and an often psychedelic sound. This period in the late 60s is the soukous era, though the term soukous now has a much broader meaning, and refers to all of the subsequent developments in Congolese music as well.

Zaiko and post Zaiko (c. 1970–90)

Stukas and Zaiko Langa Langa were the two most influential bands to emerge from this era, with Zaiko Langa Langa being an important starting ground for musicians like Pepe Feli, Bozi Boziana, Evoloko Jocker and Papa Wemba.  A smoother, mellower pop sound developed in the early 1970s, led by Bella Bella, Shama Shama and Lipua Lipua, while Verckys Kiamuangana Mateta promoted a rougher garage-like sound that launched the careers of Pepe Kalle and Kanda Bongo Man, among others.

By the beginning of the 1990s, many of the most popular musicians of the classic era had lost their edge or died, and President  Mobutu's regime continued to repress indigenous music, reinforcing Paris' status as a 
center for Congolese music.  Pepe Kalle, Kanda Bongo Man and Rigo Starr were all Paris-based and were among the most popular Congolese musicians. New styles genres like madiaba and Tshala Mwana's mutuashi achieved some popularity. Kinshasa still had popular 
musicians, however, including Bimi Ombale and Dindo Yogo.

In 1993, many of the biggest individuals and bands in Congo's history were brought together for an event that helped to revitalize Congolese music, and also jumpstarted the careers of popular bands like Swede Swede. Another notable feature in Congo culture is its sui generis music. The DRC has blended its ethnic musical sources with rumba and merengue to give birth to Soukous.

Influential figures of Soukous and its offshoots (N'dombolo, Rumba Rock) are Franco Luambo, Tabu Ley, Simaro Lutumba, Papa Wemba, Koffi Olomide, Kanda Bongo Man, Ray Lema, Mpongo Love, Abeti Masikini, Reddy Amisi, Pepe Kalle, and Nyoka Longo. One of the most talented and respected pioneers of African rhumba - Tabu Ley Pascal Rochereau.

Congolese modern music is also influenced in part by its politics. Zaire, then in 1965, Mobutu Sese Seko took over, and despite massive corruption, desperate economic failure, and the attempted military uprising of 1991, he held on until the eve of his death in 1997, when the president, Laurent Kabila.  Kabila inherited a nearly ungovernable shell of a nation. He renamed it the Democratic Republic of the Congo.

Kabila could not erase the ruinous effects of the Belgian and Mobutu legacies, and the country is now in a state of chronic civil war. Mobutu instilled a deep fear of dissent and failed to develop his country's vast resources. But the walls he built around his people and his  attempts to boost cultural and national pride certainly contributed to the environment that bred Africa's most influential pop music. Call it soukous, rumba, Zairois, Congo music, or kwassa-kwassa, the pop sound emanating from Congo's capital, Kinshasa has shaped modern African culture more profoundly than any other.

Africa produces music genres that are direct derivatives of Congolese Soukous. Some of the African bands sing in Lingala, the main language in the DRC. The same Congolese Soukous, under the guidance of "le sapeur" Papa Wemba, set the tone for a generation of young guys who dress in expensive designer clothing. The numerous singers and instrumentalists who passed through Zaiko Langa Langa went on to rule Kinshasa's bustling music scene in the '80s with such bands as Choc Stars and Papa Wemba's Viva la Musica.

One erstwhile member of Viva la Musica, Koffi Olomidé, has been indisputably the biggest Zairean/Congolese star since the early '90s. His chief rivals are two veterans of the band Wenge Musica, J.B. Mpiana and Werrason. Mpiana and Werrason each claims to be the originator of ndombolo, a style that intersperses shouts with bursts of vocal melody and harmony over a frenetic din of electric guitars, synthesizers and drums. So pervasive is this style today that even Koffi Olomidé's current repertory is mostly ndombolo.

See also
 Libanga
List of Soukous musicians
 TP OK Jazz
 Konono Nº1
 Fally Ipupa
 Ferre Gola
 Makoma
 Nathalie Makoma

References

Bibliography

External links

 Rumba in the Jungle at The Economist
 Audio clips - traditional music of the Democratic Republic of the  Congo. French National Library. Accessed November 25, 2010.  
  Audio clips: Traditional music of the Democratic Republic of the  Congo. Musée d'ethnographie de Genève. Accessed November 25, 2010.